Robert Lyman John Long (May 29, 1920 – June 27, 2002) was a four-star admiral in the United States Navy who served as Vice Chief of Naval Operations from 1977 to 1979 and Commander in Chief Pacific from 1979 to 1983.

Early years and education
Long was born in Kansas City, Missouri, and grew up there. He was the son of Trigg Allen and Margaret (Franklin) Long. He attended Paseo High School, Kansas City Junior College, and Washington University in St. Louis, before enrolling at the United States Naval Academy.

Naval career
Long graduated from the Naval Academy in 1943, served on the battleship  in the Pacific and entered the submarine service after World War II.

Long also commanded the Submarine Force, United States Atlantic fleet; Submarines, Allied Command; and Submarine Force, Western Atlantic area. He was executive assistant and naval aide to the Under Secretary of the Navy; Deputy Chief of Naval Operations and Vice Chief of Naval Operations.

Long's final navy posting was as Commander in Chief Pacific.

Awards and decorations

After the navy
Following his retirement from the navy in 1983, Long was active in a variety of governmental and the military affairs. He served as the principal executive of President Ronald Reagan's fact-finding committee, the Long Commission, that investigated the 1983 Beirut barracks bombing attack that killed 241 United States Marines. The Commission's report was widely praised for being tough and direct. The report found senior military officials responsible for security lapses and blamed the military chain of command for the disaster.

Long participated in the Security Review Commission led by General Richard G. Stilwell that grew out of the Walker spy case and which was tasked with review of security procedures conducted for security clearances.  He was a member of an American election observer team sent to the Philippines in 1986 and headed by Senator Richard Lugar to observe the Presidential election contest involving Ferdinand Marcos and Corazon Aquino. Long was teamed with the then first-term senator from Massachusetts John Kerry. He joined the Defense Policy Board in 1984, and was a part of the Advisory Committee on Command and Control of Nuclear Weapons, chaired by Jeane Kirkpatrick.

Long served as President of the Naval Academy Alumni Association from 1991 to 1994. He also served on several corporate boards, including Northrop, ConTel and GTE.

Personal life
Long married Sara Katherine Helms on August 28, 1944, in Jacksonville, Florida. He died in National Naval Medical Center in Bethesda, Maryland, on June 27, 2002. His wife died May 14, 2004, in Annapolis, Maryland. They had three children and five grandchildren.

Notes

References
New York Times Obituary
Honolulu Starbulletin Obituary
Honolulu Advertiser Obituary
List of VCNOs from the Department of the Navy – Naval Historical Center
Report of the DoD Commission on Beirut International Airport Terrorist Act, October 23, 1983
  The Lessons of Beirut: Testimony Before The Long Commission
 UnderSea Warfare Obituary, Issue 16

Further reading
 Blind Man's Bluff: The Untold Story of American Submarine Espionage, Sherry Sontag, Christopher Drew, Annette Lawrence Drew, Public Affairs, New York, 1998.

External links
Robert Lyman John Long Papers, 1977–1984 MS 340 held by Special Collections & Archives, Nimitz Library] at the United States Naval Academy]

1920 births
2002 deaths
People from Kansas City, Missouri
United States submarine commanders
United States Naval Academy alumni
United States Navy admirals
Burials at the United States Naval Academy Cemetery
Washington University in St. Louis alumni
Recipients of the Navy Distinguished Service Medal
Recipients of the Legion of Merit
Vice Chiefs of Naval Operations
United States Navy personnel of World War II